College Basketball on USA is the de facto title for the USA Network's coverage of NCAA men's basketball. During the 1980s, USA's telecasts were produced in association with Mizlou TV Sports.

Beginning in 2022, a majority of Atlantic 10 basketball games that previously aired on NBCSN will air on USA Network. These games will be produced by NBC Sports.

History

1980s coverage overview
USA aired games from the Big East Conference leading up to their coverage of the 1983 Big East tournament. USA also had rights to games from the Big Ten, ACC, and the old Metro Conference.

Regular season games aired on Thursday nights or Saturdays under the title of College Basketball... followed by the corresponding year during the season such as College Basketball '87. The games were subject to local blackouts. By this time, USA was airing games involving the Southeastern Conference (such as the Mississippi and Mississippi State) and games featuring UTEP and Wyoming.

USA also aired the National Invitation Tournament including the finals from 1985–1988.

Howard David, Bill Raftery, Steve Grad, and Duane Dow were among the commentators used by USA. USA also employed Al Albert, Mal Campbell,
Eddie Doucette, Jim Karvellas, Al Trautwig, Pat Scanlon, Bruce Beck, and Pete Maravich. Sometimes, the play-by-play announcers would work with each other and even do color.

On January 24, 1984, Al Albert, working for USA network, called what Syracuse fans call the greatest game in the Carrier Dome ever. Syracuse faced Boston College, and the teams were tied 73-73 after a missed free throw by Boston College's Martin Clark. Sean Kerins passed the rebound to Pearl Washington who took three steps and made a half court shot to win the game. Albert's call lives in infamy as The Greatest Play By Play Call in the Carrier Dome ever: "Washington, two seconds, OHHHH! 'The Pearl' hits it ..at midcourt." Syracuse University basketball fans call that the greatest nine words in Syracuse history.

2020s coverage overview
Currently NBC Sports holds the rights to 35 men's and women's Atlantic 10 basketball games. As previously mentioned, beginning with 2022, the majority of these games will air on the USA Network.

2022 schedule

See also
Men's college basketball on television
List of National Invitation Tournament postseason broadcasters
List of Big East men's basketball tournament finals broadcasters

References

External links
Basketball on the USA Network (History)

USA Network Sports
USA Network original programming
Mizlou Television Network
USA
1982 American television series debuts
1988 American television series endings